Robert Ozanne (February 13, 1898 – September 14, 1941) was a French film actor.

Selected filmography
 The Three Musketeers (1932)
 The Oil Sharks (1933)
 Miquette (1934)
 The House on the Dune (1934)
 The Lower Depths (1936)
 Pépé le Moko (1937)
 The Man of the Hour (1937)
 Woman of Malacca (1937)
 The Men Without Names (1937)
 Return at Dawn (1938)
 The Woman Thief (1938)
 The Fatted Calf (1939)
 Extenuating Circumstances (1939)
 Behind the Facade (1939)
 The Emigrant (1940)
 The Mondesir Heir (1940)
 Beating Heart (1940)
 Paris-New York (1940)
 The Last of the Six (1941)

References

Bibliography
 Youngkin, Stephen. The Lost One: A Life of Peter Lorre. University Press of Kentucky, 2005.

External links

1898 births
1941 deaths
French male film actors
Male actors from Paris
20th-century French male actors